Elaina Maureen Maxwell (born December 16, 1978) is an American mixed martial arts (MMA) fighter, and professional kickboxer.

As a three-time San Shou Champion & BJJ purple belt, she trains under the guidance of Kirian Fitzgibbons and Cesar Gracie. After winning the first American gold medal at the World Wushu (San Shou) Games in Macau, China in 2003, Elaina began to explore Brazilian jiu-jitsu.

With five titles and a San Shou record of 14-1 (2 KOs), she was booked to fight at the International Cage Fighting Organization - Warrior's Cup in Stockton, California on August 12, 2006.

Early life
Maxwell has a fraternal twin sister named Ila. She started playing soccer in grade school and played volleyball in middle school.

IKF - International Kickboxing Federation
Elaina Maxwell won the IKF Amateur San Shou Rules Super Welterweight United States Title by forfeit when her opponent Melissa Alley pulled out of the bout after the event started on July 24, 2004 in San Jose, California.

First Defense: July 23, 2005, San Jose, California: Defended her title when she defeated Tiffany Chen of New York, NY with a round kick to Chen's face that split her chin open at 1:27 of round 1 stopping the bout.

Mixed martial arts career
Maxwell was part of Strikeforce's first female mixed martial arts bout against Gina Carano on December 8, 2006. She lost the fight via Unanimous Decision.

She faced Michelle Maher in an MMA title match on July 24, 2007 at Melee on the Mountain. She won the fight via Split Decision and is currently the Golden State MMA Light Middleweight Champion.

Maxwell faced Miesha Tate at Strikeforce: Melendez vs. Thomson on June 27, 2008. She lost the fight via Unanimous Decision.

She was scheduled to face Alexis Davis at Raging Wolf 7: "Mayhem In The Mist 3" on May 8, 2010, but pulled out of the fight due to an injury.

Maxwell faced Lizbeth Carreiro at Freestyle Cage Fighting 44 on July 24, 2010. She won the fight via TKO in the first round.

Her next fight was against Alexis Davis at Raging Wolf 9 on August 28, 2010. This fight was originally for the Raging Wolf Women's Flyweight Championship but Maxwell was unable to make the 135 lbs weight limit, so the fight was changed to a non-title, three-round contest. Maxwell won the fight by unanimous decision.

On November 19, 2010, Maxwell faced Shayna Baszler at The Cage Inc. - Battle At The Border 7. Despite controlling the striking exchanges, Maxwell lost the fight by submission due to a kneebar in the first round.

Maxwell faced fellow Strikeforce veteran Shana Olsen at Crowbar MMA: Spring Brawl 2 on April 29, 2011 in Fargo, North Dakota. She won the fight by unanimous decision.

On July 23, 2011, Maxwell faced Angela Samaro at King of the Cage: Shockwave in Oroville, California. She defeated Samaro by TKO in the third round.

Maxwell faced Ashley Sanchez at Resurrection Fighting Alliance 2 on March 30, 2012 in Kearney, Nebraska. She won the fight by unanimous decision.

Maxwell was scheduled to face Julia Budd at Invicta Fighting Championships 3 on October 6, 2012, but she was forced to withdraw from the fight due to suffering a concussion in training.

Media
Maxwell was featured on MSNBC's Warrior Nation as she prepared to face Gina Carano.

Mixed martial arts record

|-
| Win
| align=center| 7-4
| Ashley Sanchez
| Decision (unanimous)
| RFA 2 - Yvel vs. Alexander
| 
| align=center| 3
| align=center| 5:00
| Kearney, Nebraska, United States
| 
|-
| Win
| align=center| 6-4
| Angela Samaro
| TKO (elbows)
| KOTC: Shockwave
| 
| align=center| 3
| align=center| 1:00
| Oroville, California, United States
| 
|-
| Win
| align=center| 5-4
| Shana Olsen
| Decision (unanimous)
| Crowbar MMA - Spring Brawl 2
| 
| align=center| 3
| align=center| 5:00
| Fargo, North Dakota, United States
| 
|-
| Loss
| align=center| 4-4
| Shayna Baszler
| Submission (kneebar)
| The Cage Inc. - Battle At The Border 7
| 
| align=center| 1
| align=center| 4:03
| Hankinson, North Dakota, United States
| 
|-
| Win
| align=center| 4-3
| Alexis Davis
| Decision (unanimous)
| RW 9: Mayhem In The Mist 4
| 
| align=center| 3
| align=center| 5:00
| Niagara Falls, New York, United States
| 
|-
| Win
| align=center| 3-3
| Lizbeth Carreiro
| TKO (punches)
| Freestyle Cage Fighting 44
| 
| align=center| 1
| align=center| 2:55
| Claremore, Oklahoma, United States
| 
|-
| Loss
| align=center| 2-3
| Miesha Tate
| Decision (unanimous)
| Strikeforce: Melendez vs. Thomson
| 
| align=center| 3
| align=center| 3:00
| San Jose, California, United States
| 
|-
| Win
| align=center| 2-2
| Michelle Maher
| Decision (split)
| MOTM - Melee on the Mountain
| 
| align=center| 5
| align=center| 5:00
| Friant, California, United States
| 
|-
| Loss
| align=center| 1-2
| Michelle Maher
| Decision (unanimous)
| Strikeforce: Young Guns
| 
| align=center| 3
| align=center| 3:00
| San Jose, California, United States
| 
|-
| Loss
| align=center| 1-1
| Gina Carano
| Decision (unanimous)
| Strikeforce: Triple Threat
| 
| align=center| 3
| align=center| 2:00
| San Jose, California, United States
| 
|-
| Win
| align=center| 1-0
| Michelle Maher
| KO (punches)
| WC - Warriors Cup
| 
| align=center| 1
| align=center| 1:05
| Stockton, California, United States
|

See also
 List of female mixed martial artists

References

External links 
 Elaina Maxwell Awakening Profile
 
 Official MySpace Page

Living people
American female mixed martial artists
Mixed martial artists utilizing sanshou
Mixed martial artists utilizing Brazilian jiu-jitsu
American practitioners of Brazilian jiu-jitsu
Female Brazilian jiu-jitsu practitioners
1978 births
Sportspeople from San Jose, California
American sanshou practitioners
American female kickboxers
21st-century American women